The 1990 World Series of Poker (WSOP) was a series of poker tournaments held at Binion's Horseshoe.

Preliminary events

Main Event

There were 194 entrants to the main event. Each paid $10,000 to enter the tournament. For the first time since the 1984 WSOP Main Event, the final table had nine players. On the third day of the tournament, Stu Ungar was found unconscious on the floor of his hotel room from a drug overdose. However, he had such a chip lead that even when the dealers kept taking his blinds out every orbit, Ungar still made the final table and finished ninth pocketing $25,050.

Final table

Other high finishes

NB: This list is restricted to top 30 finishers with an existing Wikipedia entry.

References

World Series of Poker
World Series of Poker